This is a list of Billboard magazine's top popular songs of 1949 according to retail sales.

Year-end list

See also
1949 in music
List of number-one singles of 1949 (U.S.)

References

1949 record charts
Billboard charts